Bank Notes Act is a stock short title used in the United Kingdom for legislation relating to bank notes.

List
The Bank Notes Acts 1826 to 1852 was the collective title of the following Acts:
The Bank Notes Act 1826 (7 Geo 4 c 6)
The Country Bankers Act 1826 (7 Geo 4 c 46)
The Bank Notes Act 1828 (9 Geo 4 c 23)
The Bank Notes (No. 2) Act 1828 (9 Geo 4 c 65)
The Bank Notes Act 1833 (3 & 4 Will 4 c 83)
The Bank Notes Act 1852 (16 & 17 Vict c 2)

The Bank Notes (Scotland) Acts 1756 to 1854 is the collective title of the following Acts:
The Bank Notes (Scotland) Act 1765 (5 Geo 3 c 49)
The Bankers (Scotland) Act 1826 (7 Geo 4 c 67)
The Bank Notes (Scotland) Act 1845 (8 & 9 Vict c 38)
The Bankers' Composition (Scotland) Act 1853 (16 & 17 Vict c 63)
The Bankers (Scotland) Act 1854 (17 & 18 Vict c 73)

The Bank Notes (Ireland) Acts 1825 to 1864 is the collective title of the following Acts:
The Bankers (Ireland) Act 1825 (6 Geo 4 c 42)
The Bank Notes (No. 2) Act 1828 (9 Geo 4 c 65)
The Bankers' Composition (Ireland) Act 1828 (9 Geo 4 c 80)
The Bank Notes (Ireland) Act 1828 (9 Geo 4 c 81)
The Banks (Ireland) Act 1830 (11 Geo 4 & 1 Will 4 c 32)
The Bankers (Ireland) Act 1845 (8 & 9 Vict c 37)
The Bank Notes (Ireland) Act 1864 (27 & 28 Vict c 78)
The Bank Post Bills Composition (Ireland) Act 1864 (27 & 28 Vict c 86)

Currency and Bank Notes Act

Currency and Bank Notes Act 1914 (4 & 5 Geo 5 c 14)
Currency and Bank Notes (Amendment) Act 1914 (4 & 5 Geo 5 c 72)
Currency and Bank Notes Act 1928 (18 & 19 Geo 5 c 13)
Currency and Bank Notes Act 1939
Currency and Bank Notes Act 1954 (2 & 3 Eliz 2 c 12)

See also

List of short titles

References

Lists of legislation by short title and collective title
Banking legislation in the United Kingdom